Choi Myong-hui (born 13 June 1966) is a North Korean gymnast. She competed in six events at the 1980 Summer Olympics.

References

External links
 

1966 births
Living people
North Korean female artistic gymnasts
Olympic gymnasts of North Korea
Gymnasts at the 1980 Summer Olympics
Place of birth missing (living people)
Asian Games medalists in gymnastics
Gymnasts at the 1982 Asian Games
Asian Games silver medalists for North Korea
Medalists at the 1982 Asian Games
20th-century North Korean women